The 2012 World Aesthetic Gymnastics Championships, the 13th edition of the Aesthetic group gymnastics competition, was held in Cartagena, Spain from May 25 to 27, at the Municipal Sports Hall of Cartagena.

Medal winners

References

External links
http://www.ifagg.com/competition/new-results/ 
https://ifagg.sporttisaitti.com/

World Aesthetic Gymnastics Championships
International gymnastics competitions hosted by Spain 
2012 in gymnastics
Sport in Cartagena, Spain